John Edward Seeley (August 1, 1810 – March 30, 1875) was a U.S. Representative from New York.

Born in Ovid, New York, Seeley attended Ovid Academy and was graduated from Yale College in 1835, where he was a member of Skull and Bones.
He studied law.
He was admitted to the bar and commenced practice in Monroe, Michigan.
He returned to Ovid, New York, in 1839.
Supervisor of Ovid in 1842.
County judge and surrogate of Seneca County, New York from 1851 to 1855.
He served as delegate to the Republican National Convention in 1856.

In the 1860 presidential election, he was a presidential elector for Abraham Lincoln and Hannibal Hamiln.

Seeley was elected as a Republican to the Forty-second Congress (March 4, 1871 – March 3, 1873).
He resumed the practice of his profession in Ovid, New York, and died there March 30, 1875.
He was interred on his farm near Ovid.

References

Sources

1810 births
1875 deaths
Yale College alumni
Republican Party members of the United States House of Representatives from New York (state)
People from Ovid, New York
19th-century American politicians
1860 United States presidential electors